Capt. John Ames (April 7, 1738 – June 17, 1805) was a patriot, Captain in the American Revolutionary War, gunsmith, shovel maker, and ancestor of the Ames family of Easton, Massachusetts.

Biography 
Capt. John Ames was born April 7, 1738, second son of Thomas Ames of Bridgewater, MA, and Keziah Howard. He married Susanna Howard in 1759 or 1757. Their children were: David, Keziah and Susanna, Huldah, Abigail, Cynthia, John, and Oliver Ames Sr. His brother, Sylvanus Ames, was a Harvard educated Episcopal Methodist priest who served as the rector of Trinity church in Taunton, MA, and died in 1778 while serving with the continental army at Valley Forge.

Blacksmith 
Ames was a blacksmith in Bridgewater, Massachusetts. After the "nail and splitting mills" were outlawed by the government in Great Britain to give iron manufacturers in Britain a monopoly in 1773, Ames switched to making shovels. Despite having only a crude factory, he was able to make shovels of notable quality. In fact, he was said to have developed a shovel "so perfect that further improvement seems impossible."
The remains of his trip hammer stone and man-made weirs and dams can be seen at War Memorial Park (West Bridgewater, Massachusetts).

Revolutionary War 
John Ames made guns for the Massachusetts army during the American Revolutionary War.

During the war, Ames served in the Massachusetts Militia. In December 1776, the Militia was sent to Newport, RI to try and prevent British troops from securing a stronghold. John served 15 days alongside two of Washington's generals (one being Benedict Arnold). In June 1778, they returned to Newport to assist a French fleet in attacks against the British but were sent home after 24 days when the Continental Army under Gilbert du Motier, Marquis de Lafayette did not arrive. The last documented service was in July, 1780, when Admiral de Ternay (Charles-Henri-Louis d'Arsac de Ternay) landed 6,000 French troops in Rhode Island and the Militia was sent to protect them from the British. He served as captain in Colonel Edward Mitchell's Regiment in 1776; as captain in Colonel Wade's Regiment, 1778; captain in Major Eliphalet Carey's Regiment, 1780; and Second Major of the 3d Regiment, 1780.  Despite being promoted to major, he was known as "captain" for the rest of his life.

Captain John Ames died in Bridgewater, Massachusetts. At least one source lists his date of death as July 17, 1803.  This is probably an error as other sources state the date of death as July 17, 1805, and his tombstone states he died "in his 68th year".

Ames family and legacy
The Ames family eventually became a very influential and wealthy family in Massachusetts, establishing two factories as well as having influence in the American railroad expansion and government.

Capt. John's son David Ames (born 1760) was appointed by George Washington to be the first head of the Springfield Armory.

Two factories were started by descendants of Capt. John Ames, in different regions of Massachusetts. Ames' son Oliver Ames Sr. went on to found the Ames Shovel Shop in Easton, Massachusetts. Ames' descendants (grandchildren?), brothers James Tyler Ames and Nathan Peabody Ames, went on to found the Ames Manufacturing Company in Chicopee, Massachusetts in 1835.

His great-grandson Oliver Ames became governor of Massachusetts, 1887–1890.

References 

1738 births
1805 deaths
American blacksmiths
Continental Army officers from Massachusetts
People from Bridgewater, Massachusetts
Butler–Ames family